The American Hereford Association is an organization in the USA that promotes Hereford cattle.

It was founded in 1883 and operated out of the home of Charles Gudgel in Independence, Missouri.

In 1899, it hosted the Hereford Association Cattle Show in a tent in the Kansas City stockyards. The show evolved into the American Royal, a livestock show, horse show, rodeo, and barbecue competition.

From 1919 to 1953, its headquarters was at 300 W. 11th Street in Kansas City across the street from the Lyric Theatre. On October 16, 1953, Dwight D. Eisenhower presided over the opening of a new headquarters on Quality Hill in Kansas City overlooking the stockyards and the West Bottoms. The headquarters at 715 Kirk Drive included a famous restaurant but its most distinctive feature was fiberglass statue of a Hereford bull on a 90-foot pylon which became a landmark.

The bull was nicknamed "Bob" by locals ("Bull on Building") and was either loved as an icon or reviled as kitsch that detracted from the city's beauty. The statue's sculptor was Paul Decker with the firm Rochetti and Parzini of New York, New York, and it was fabricated at Colonial Plastic Corporation of Newark, New Jersey.

In 1995, the Association merged with the American Polled Hereford Association.

In 1997, the Association moved a few way blocks away to 1501 Wyandotte and its headquarters were sold to the HNTB architecture firm which took down the bull. In 2002, the bull was restored to a 60-foot pylon across I-35 in Mulkey Square.

References

External links
Official website
Kansas City Public Library history
Kansas City High Hereford - LIFE Magazine

Independence, Missouri
Agricultural organizations based in the United States
1883 establishments in Missouri
Hereford cattle